Marcantonio Riverditi (died 1744) was an Italian painter of the Baroque. He was born in Alessandria della Paglia, and trained in  Bologna, where he followed the style of Guido Reni.

He painted portraits and altarpieces such as a  Annunciation for the church of the Padri Camaldolesi and a S. Francesco di Paola for the church of Santa Maria de Foscherari. He died at Bologna.

References

Italian Baroque painters
Painters from Bologna
People from Alessandria
1744 deaths
18th-century Italian painters
Italian male painters
Year of birth unknown
18th-century Italian male artists